Raalte is a railway station located in Raalte, Netherlands. The station originally opened on 1 January 1881 and is located on the Zwolle–Almelo railway. The train services are currently operated by Keolis Nederland. Between 1910 and 1935, there was also a railway line between Deventer and Ommen which crossed the Zwolle–Almelo railway at Raalte.

Train services

Bus services

External links
NS website 
Dutch Public Transport journey planner 

Railway stations in Overijssel
Railway stations opened in 1881
Raalte
1881 establishments in the Netherlands
Railway stations in the Netherlands opened in the 19th century